The following Forbes list of German billionaires is based on an annual assessment of wealth and assets compiled and published by Forbes magazine in 2021.

2021 German billionaires list top 30

2019 German billionaires list top 30

2015 German billionaires list top 40

See also
 Forbes list of billionaires
 List of countries by the number of billionaires

References

 
Germany
Economy of Germany-related lists